Anthony Quartuccio is an American music director and conductor.

Career
Quartuccio has conducted both concert halls and Operas. He has made appearances around the country and in Asia and the Czech Republic. Quartuccio received a Bachelor of Music Degree from Santa Clara University. In 2006 he received a lifetime achievement award in the Arts from the Italian American Heritage Foundation.

Personal life
Quartuccio's father, Anthony Quartuccio, Sr. (November 1922 - October 16, 2011) was a locally renowned author and illustrator in Northern California.

References 

American male conductors (music)
Music directors (opera)
Santa Clara University alumni
Living people
Year of birth missing (living people)
Place of birth missing (living people)
21st-century American conductors (music)
21st-century American male musicians